The women's 45 kilograms competition at the 2021 World Weightlifting Championships was held on 8 December 2021.

Schedule

Medalists

Records

Results

References

Results

Women's 45 kg
World Championships